Gatlin Peak is a prominent but somewhat detached snow-covered peak, rising  northeast of Steel Peak at the northeast end of the Welch Mountains, in Palmer Land, Antarctica. It was mapped by the United States Geological Survey in 1974, and was named by the Advisory Committee on Antarctic Names for Lieutenant Donald H. Gatlin, U.S. Navy Reserve, a navigator on LC-130 aerial photographic flights during Operation Deep Freeze 1968 and 1969.

References

Mountains of Palmer Land